Denby is a village in Derbyshire, England.

Denby may also refer to:

Places and organizations
 Denby, South Dakota, an unincorporated community
 Denby High School, a school in Detroit, Michigan, U.S.
 Denby Pottery Company, a manufacturer in Denby, England
 Denby Transport, a haulage company based in Lincoln, England
 Denby House, a historic raised cottage in Mobile, Alabama, U.S.
 Denby Dale, a parish in the borough of Kirklees, West Yorkshire, England
 Upper Denby, a village in the parish of Denby Dale
 Lower Denby, a village in the parish of Denby Dale

Other uses
 Denby (surname)
 Denby, a forename, as in Denby Browning
 DENBY, hymn tune composed in 1904 by Charles J. Dale

See also
 Denby Bottles, an area of settlement in Denby, Derbyshire, England
 Daniela Denby-Ashe (born 1980), English actress
 Demby, a surname
 Denbigh
 Denbigh (disambiguation)